The Social-National Party (PSN) was a political party in France founded in the spring of 1933 by Jean Hennessy, a former cabinet minister. Hennessy, elected deputy for Nice in the Alpes-Maritimes was rarely active in the Independent Left parliamentary group. However, Hennessy was part of The Vichy 80 in 1940 which refused to give full powers to Marshal Philippe Pétain.

The Social-National Party dissolved in 1936.

References

1933 establishments in France
1936 disestablishments in France
Defunct political parties in France
Left-wing parties in France
Political parties of the French Third Republic
Political parties established in 1933
Political parties disestablished in 1936